Pueblo Nuevo District may refer to:

Peru
Pueblo Nuevo District, Chincha
Pueblo Nuevo District, Chepén
Pueblo Nuevo District, Ferreñafe
Pueblo Nuevo District, Ica

District name disambiguation pages